Vepraalam is a 1984 Indian Malayalam film, directed by Menon Suresh and produced by P. K. R. Pillai. The film stars Sukumari, Adoor Bhasi, Lakshmi and Menaka in the lead roles. The film has musical score by K. V. Mahadevan.

Cast
P. K. R. Pillai
Sukumari as Sumathi
Adoor Bhasi as Godfather 
Lakshmi as Rajalakshmi
Menaka as Beena
Rajkumar as Babu
Bahadoor as Paulson
Mala Aravindan as Jolly John
Nithya as Anu

Soundtrack
The music was composed by K. V. Mahadevan and the lyrics were written by Balu Kiriyath.

References

External links
 

1984 films
1980s Malayalam-language films
Films scored by K. V. Mahadevan